12 canciones de García Lorca para guitarra (12 Songs by García Lorca for Guitar) is an album by Paco de Lucía and Ricardo Modrego. It is the second of three collaboration albums between the duo.

Track listing

Musicians
Paco de Lucía – Flamenco guitar
Ricardo Modrego – Flamenco guitar

References
 Gamboa, Manuel José and Nuñez, Faustino. (2003). Paco de Lucía. Madrid:Universal Music Spain.

1965 albums
Paco de Lucía albums
PolyGram albums
Collaborative albums
Instrumental albums